Betty Moczynski (June 30, 1926 – October 11, 2017) played in the All-American Girls Professional Baseball League between 1943 and 1947.  She was nicknamed Moe in the league.  She both batted and threw right-handed and held the position of utility outfield.

Early life 
Betty was born in Milwaukee, Wisconsin on June 30, 1926.  She grew up in West Allis.  She was one of the original members of the league. In 1943, she did a tryout at Wrigley Field and was right away assigned to the Rockford Peaches.

Playing professional baseball 
During her first season playing in 1943 for the Rockford Peaches,  Moe drove in 5 runs in one game, which was just one short of the record for that year. As well, she had a double, two triples and a home run along with 13 stolen bases in her sole season with the team.  A year later she moved over to the National Girls Baseball League Chicago Bluebirds until 1947, as a catcher and outfielder.  Moe played 16 seasons professionally.  As she herself said, "we were pioneers in women's sports."  Moczynski was also inducted into the Walls of Honor, which was a tribute from the Brewers to Wisconsin major league natives.

Batting record

Sources 
1.  AAGPBL 
2.  Linden Grove Today 
3.  Lacrosse Tribune

References 

1926 births
2017 deaths
Baseball players from Milwaukee
All-American Girls Professional Baseball League players
National Girls Baseball League players
21st-century American women
American female baseball players